Iodro (Ĵodro) is a rural locality (a selo) in Ongudaysky District, the Altai Republic, Russia. The population was 268 as of 2016. There are 4 streets.

Geography 
Iodro is located 100 km southeast of Onguday (the district's administrative centre) by road. Akbom is the nearest rural locality.

References 

Rural localities in Ongudaysky District